Thánh Gióng (chữ Nôm: 聖揀, Saint Gióng), also known as Phù Đổng Thiên Vương ( chữ Hán: 扶董天王, Heavenly Prince of Phù Đổng), Sóc Thiên Vương (chữ Hán: 朔天王), Ông Gióng (sir Gióng) and Xung Thiên Thần Vương (Divine Prince of Heaven) is a mythical folk hero of Vietnam's history and one of The Four Immortals. According to the legend, Gióng was a boy who rode on an iron horse and won against the enemy of the state. The most well known version of the legend had him battle against the Chinese army, thus, he is considered the first anti-invasion hero of the Vietnamese. Some researchers believe he is the Vietnamese version of Vaiśravaṇa.

The folk hero was a popular subject for poets, such as Cao Bá Quát who wrote an epic poem to Thánh Gióng in the 19th century. Today Thánh Gióng features with other legendary figures such as Kinh Dương Vương, Âu Cơ, Sơn Tinh and Thủy Tinh, in elementary school texts.

Legends
There are many versions of the legend of Thánh Gióng. But they all have the same general story: In ancient time, there was a fearsome enemy, the king sent his men to seek for a talented person to defeat the enemy. In Phù Đổng village, there was a child, though being three years old, he was incapable of speech or crawl. But as soon as he heard about the king seeking for talent, he spoke. He then joined the army, asked the king for a sword and a horse, and defeated the enemy. After peace was restored, he flew away.

Việt điện u linh tập 
In Việt Điện U Linh Tập, Thánh Gióng is known as Sóc Thiên Vương. This version does not specify when the story was set nor who was the enemy. It says in the old days, there was an enemy in the country, the king ordered his emissaries to find some one who can defeat the enemy. The Heavenly King (which is what Thánh Gióng is called in the story) was a baby at the time. Having heard the news, he told his mother to prepare a lot of food for him. A few months later, he grew into a big man and joined the army. The emissary brought him to the capital. The king was very happy and asked him: "What is that that you want?" to which the Heavenly King answered: "Please give me a long sword and an iron horse." The king accepted. The Heavenly King drew his sword and rode his horse into battle. Once he defeated the enemy and restored peace in the country, he rode his horse to Vệ Linh mountain, climbed onto a banyan tree and fly away. The people erected a temple to worship him. The Lý dynasty also erected a temple dedicated to him in Cảo Hương village near West Lake.

Thiền uyển tập anh has a follow up to the story: In the Early Lê dynasty, Buddhist monk Khuông Việt travelled to Vệ Linh mountain and wanted to build a house there. That night, he dreamt of a deity who wore gold armor, carried a golden spear in his left hand and a tower in his right hand, followed by more than ten people. The deity said: "I am Vaiśravaṇa, my escorts are all Yaksa. The Heavenly Emperor sent me to this country to help the people, you are blessed to be able to talk to me." The monk woke up and heard loud cries in the mountain. The next day, he found a large unusual tree in the mountains, he cut it down and built a temple. In 891, the Song dynasty invaded, emperor Lê Hoàn told Buddhist monks to pray at the temple. The Song army at Tây Kết village suddenly retreat to Chi river, they then met with a large storm and withdrew back to China. Lê Hoàn built more temple to Tì Sa Môn Thiên Vương.

Lĩnh Nam chích quái 
In king Hùng's time, the country was peaceful. The king of Ân planned an invasion under the pretext of punishing king Hùng for not paying tribute. King Hùng asked his men for a way to fight back, one of them said: "Why don't we ask the dragon king to fight them for us?" The king held a large prayers, suddenly there's heavy rain and an old man appeared. The king thought the man was unusual, and asked him how to fight the invader. The old man predicted that the enemy will invade in three years, and to fight back, the king must "forge weapons, train soldiers, and find talents in the country. Those who defeat the enemy will be rewarded with land and title." The old man flew away, the king realized that he's the dragon king.

Three years later, the Ân invaded, the king followed the dragon king's advice and sought for talented man. In Phù Đổng village, there's a 60-year-old rich man who had a son. This child was already 3 years old yet he couldn't talk or sit. When the king's emissary arrived to his village, his mom jokingly said: "I gave birth to this child who only know how to eat, he doesn't know how to fight the enemy to receive the reward and repay his parents." The child suddenly spoke: "Mom, invite the emissary to see what he got to say". The emissary arrived and asked the child what did he want, the child answered: "Tell the king to forge an iron horse 18 thước high, an iron sword 7 thước long and an iron helmet." The child then grew up very fast. When Ân army arrived at Trâu mountain, the child, now a 10 trượng tall man, stood up. He drew his sword and yell "I am a general from heaven", he wore his helmet, rode on his horse and engage the enemy. The enemy was defeated, the king of Ân was killed. The man went to Sóc mountain and fly away with his horse. Hùng king titled him Heavenly King of Phù Đổng. Since then, the Ân dynasty didn't dare to invade Hùng king anymore, and the surrounding country respected him more. The Lý dynasty titled him Xung Thiên Thần Vương.

Đại Việt sử ký toàn thư 
In the 6th generation of King Hùng, there was a rich man in Phù Đổng village, Vũ Ninh division, who gave birth to a son. The child was three years old but couldn't talk or laugh. At time, there were an emergency in the country, the king ordered to find someone who can defeat the enemy. That day, the child suddenly spoke, told his mother to invite the emissary in and said: “I want a sword and a horse, the king don’t need to worry” The little child rode his horse in the front, the soldiers followed behind. They defeated the enemy at Vũ Ninh mountain. The enemy called the child general from heaven and came to surrender. The child rode his horse into the sky and went away. The king ordered to renovate his house into a temple and worshiped him.

Version collected by Nguyễn Đổng Chi 
This version is the most well-known version today. It is similar to Lĩnh Nam chích quái's version. However, in this version Phù Đổng Thiên Vương has a name, Gióng. Instead of a rich man, his parent was an old woman who lived alone and became pregnant after stepping on to a giant footprint that trampled her field. It also has more dialogues and details such as: the horse in this version can spit fire, the swords and armors are so heavy only Gióng can carry them. During the battle, Gióng's sword broke and he had to use bamboo instead.

Legacy

Memorial 
The Saint Giong Festival has been held since the defeat against the An, and it officially became a national holiday in the 11th century during the dynasty of Emperor of Lý Thái Tổ, the founder of the Lý dynasty.

A huge magnificent bronze statue of Thanh Giong in full armor riding his horse jumping up towards the sky can be admired near Sóc Sơn 30 km north of Hanoi. Superb panorama of the region from the hill top

Heritage
 In 2010, UNESCO has listed Thanh Giong in Intangible Cultural Heritage in Need of Urgent Safeguarding 
 UNESCO officially recognized Saint Giong festival as a world intangible cultural heritage of humanity at 10:20 pm in Indochina time zone.

Saint Giong Festival 
Usually celebrated at Phu Dong village, Gia Lâm District, Hanoi on the 4th day of the Fourth month of Vietnamese calendar every year. The Celebration tributes the hero who saved the country that stood against the army invaders. People have to prepare their performance for this festival from 1 st of third lunar to 5th fourth lunar month. On the 6th of the Fourth lunar month, the festival begins with the ceremony of praying for the weather. On the 7th day of the Fourth lunar month, villagers bring trays of vegetarian food to recreate the moment villagers who contributed food to Saint Giong. The festival continues the ritual until 12th day of the Fourth lunar month.

References

Vietnamese mythology
Vietnamese gods
Vietnamese deities